Osier is a ghost town in Delta County, in the U.S. state of Michigan.

History
A post office was established at Osier in 1898, closed in 1901, reopened in 1910, and closed permanently in 1927. Osier was named from a grove of willow (commonly known as osier) trees near the town site.

References

Geography of Delta County, Michigan
Ghost towns in Michigan